La Campaneta is a parish belonging to the municipality of Orihuela, Alicante, Spain, with a population of around 1225. It has a large shoe industry, as well as various agricultural companies.

Geography of the Province of Alicante
Towns in Spain
Populated places in the Province of Alicante
Vega Baja del Segura